James Wilson Robinson (8 January 1899 – unknown) was a Northern Irish footballer. His regular position was as a forward. He was born in Belfast. He played for Belfast Junior Football, Manchester United, and Tranmere Rovers.

References

External links
MUFCInfo.com profile

1899 births
Year of death missing
Association footballers from Belfast
Irish association footballers (before 1923)
Association football wingers
Manchester United F.C. players
Tranmere Rovers F.C. players
English Football League players